The list of ship launches in 1844 includes a chronological list of some ships launched in 1844.


References

Sources

1844
Ship launches